The 2020 D.C. United season was the club's 25th season of existence, and their 25th consecutive season playing in Major League Soccer, the top flight of American soccer. The regular season began on February 29, 2020 (making it the first time the season began in February), and was suspended on March 12, 2020 due to the COVID-19 pandemic. The club's season is resumed on July 13, 2020 with the MLS is Back Tournament at the ESPN Wide World of Sports Complex near Orlando, Florida, where group stage fixtures counted towards the regular season standings. The season ended on November 8, 2020 with their final regular season match.

Due to the COVID-19 pandemic, United's slate of external competitions were greatly altered. The club was slated to participate in the 2020 U.S. Open Cup beginning in April, however that tournament was cancelled due to the pandemic. Additionally, United was slated to play in the 2020 Leagues Cup, a secondary knock-out tournament for the top MLS clubs which did not qualify for the 2020 CONCACAF Champions League. As with the Open Cup, the Leagues Cup was cancelled due to the pandemic.

The 2020 season has also brought changes to D.C. United's coaching staff. After a string of losses, which pushed United to last place in the Eastern Conference's standings, head coach Ben Olsen was replaced by assistant coach Chad Ashton on October 8, 2020.

Preseason exhibitions

Competitive fixtures

Major League Soccer

Standings

Eastern Conference

Overall

Results by round

Results summary

U.S. Open Cup

Leagues Cup

MLS is Back Tournament

Group C

Squad information

First team roster

Coaching and management staff

Statistics

Appearances and goals

|-
|colspan="14"|Players that left the club during the season:
|-

|}

Awards

MLS Team of the Week

Transfers and loans

Transfers in

Transfers out

MLS SuperDraft picks

Loans in

See also 
 2020 Loudoun United FC season

Notes

References 

D.C. United seasons
Dc United
Dc United
2020 in sports in Washington, D.C.